Clarisse Imaniriho (born 1995) is a Rwandan politician who has served as a member of the Chamber of Deputies since 2019. She represents a seat reserved for the Rwandan youth in the Chamber of Deputies.

Early life and education 
Imaniriho was born in 1995 in Bwishyura, Karongi District. She was the last born of four children who were raised by a their single widowed mother. She received a bachelor's degree from the University of Rwanda in 2017.

Career 
Elected at age 23 in the 2018 Rwandan parliamentary election, Imaniriho became the youngest MP in the country after taking office.

References 

Living people
Members of the Chamber of Deputies (Rwanda)
Year of birth missing (living people)
Place of birth missing (living people)
21st-century Rwandan women politicians
21st-century Rwandan politicians

1995 births
University of Rwanda alumni
People from Karongi District